The Radenci Basin is a floodplain of the Mura River in Slovenia.

Geography
The Radenci Basin lies on the right side of the Mura River, between Gornja Radgona and Hrastje–Mota, primarily in the Municipality of Radenci. It is separated from the nearby Apače Basin by the Radgona Hills, which are an extension of the Slovene Hills.

References

External links
Radenci Basin on Geopedia

Structural basins of Slovenia